Get Like Me may refer to:

 "Get Like Me" (David Banner song), 2008
 "Get Like Me" (Nelly song), 2013
 "Get Like Me", 2019 song by Bhad Bhabie